The Apache OpenNLP library is a machine learning based toolkit for the processing of natural language text. It supports the most common NLP tasks, such as language detection, tokenization, sentence segmentation, part-of-speech tagging, named entity extraction, chunking, parsing and coreference resolution. These tasks are usually required to build more advanced text processing services.

See also 

 Unstructured Information Management Architecture (UIMA)
 General Architecture for Text Engineering (GATE)
 cTAKES

References

External links
Apache OpenNLP Website

Natural language processing
Statistical natural language processing
Natural language processing toolkits
OpenNLP
Java (programming language) libraries
Cross-platform software
2004 software